Moto G10 (stylized by Motorola as moto g10) is a series of Android smartphones developed by Motorola Mobility, a subsidiary of Lenovo. It is the tenth generation of the Moto G family.

Specifications
Some specifications such as wireless technologies and storage will differ between regions.

References

Mobile phones introduced in 2021
Android (operating system) devices
Motorola mobile phones
Mobile phones with multiple rear cameras
Mobile phones with 4K video recording